Susanna Höller is an Austrian football defender, currently playing for VfL Sindelfingen in the German 2nd Bundesliga. She is a member of the Austrian national team.

References

1989 births
Living people
Austrian women's footballers
Expatriate women's footballers in Germany
Austrian expatriate women's footballers
Austrian expatriate sportspeople in Germany
Austria women's international footballers
Women's association football defenders
Women's association football midfielders
ÖFB-Frauenliga players
2. Frauen-Bundesliga players
DFC LUV Graz players
People from Voitsberg
Footballers from Styria